"Of the Surface of Things" is a poem from Wallace Stevens's first book of poetry, Harmonium (1923). It was first published in 1919, so it is in the public domain.

Buttel understands the poem as implementing Stevens's "anti-poetic" strategy of moving into a poem in an offhand way. He finds that the prose rhythms of the first stanza contrast strikingly with the metrical regularity of the quoted line about the belle undressing. That line is so delicately honest that it almost had to be quoted in order to give the speaker some distance from it. The sturdy epistemic modesty of the first stanza contrasts with the intense opacity of the final stanza. Is it saying that the real tree basks in the illumination of imagination? Is the singer a poet like Walt Whitman, who pushes through what is prosaic ("three or four hills and a cloud") or beyond his understanding, in order to give full vent to his imagination in, for instance, "Song of Myself"? 

Milton Bates speculates that the "cloak" is probably the cloud and the "singer" one of the hills.

The poem can also be read as one of Stevens's many commentaries on the relation of imagination to reality: the poet's previously written line about the belle undressing (the imagination's formulation) contrasts with the actual scene portrayed in the first part of the poem. To the imagination the color of a tree is easily transformed. The "singer" in the penultimate line is, by such a reading, the poet who obscures the real world by pulling the cloak of his imagination over his head, enabling him to see the moon in its folds.

Notes

References 
Bates, Milton J. Wallace Stevens: A Mythology of Self. 1985: University of California Press.
Buttel, Robert. Wallace Stevens: The Making of Harmonium. 1967: Princeton University Press.

External links 
 The Complete Public Domain Poems of Wallace Stevens, Volume 1

1919 poems
American poems
Poetry by Wallace Stevens